Anthony Nicholas Granato   (born March 18, 1981) is an Italian–Canadian professional baseball infielder who is a free agent.

Granato attended Virginia Commonwealth University and played in the farm systems of the Chicago Cubs and Colorado Rockies. He subsequently played in the Canadian-American Association and Atlantic League of Professional Baseball. Between 2010 and 2011 he played for San Marino Baseball Club in the Italian Baseball League, then he didn't play for any franchise.

Despite it, he continued to play with the Italy national baseball team, being also called for the 2013 World Baseball Classic.

References

External links

1981 births
Baseball pitchers
Living people
2013 World Baseball Classic players
Boise Hawks players
Lansing Lugnuts players
Daytona Cubs players
Peoria Chiefs players
Modesto Nuts players
Atlantic City Surf players
Somerset Patriots players
Baseball players from Toronto
VCU Rams baseball players
Sugar Land Skeeters players